The 2021–22 Ardal NW season (also known as the 2021–22 Lock Stock Ardal NW season for sponsorship reasons) was the first season of the new third-tier northern region football in Welsh football pyramid, part of the Ardal Leagues, after the cancellation of the previous season due to the COVID-19 pandemic in Wales.

Teams
The league was made up of 16 teams competing for one automatic promotion place to Cymru North, whilst the second-placed team qualified for a play-off with the second-placed team of Ardal NE. Three teams were relegated to Tier 4.

Stadia and locations

Source: Ardal NW Ground Information

League table

Results

References

External links
Football Association of Wales

2021–22 in Welsh football
Ardal Leagues